Shafna Nizam (born 15 June 1990) is an Indian actress who is active in Malayalam films and television serials. She made her acting debut as a child artist in Malayalam with Chinthavishtayaya Shyamala (1998). She played the lead role in television series “Sundari”, marking her TV debut. She received a Kerala State Television Award for Best Actress in 2016 for Sahayathrika establishing herself as a lead actress in Malayalam television industry.

Acting career 
Shafna was well recognized by the Malayalam audience from the films Katha Parayumbol and Oru Indian Pranayakatha. She was also well appreciated for her role in the film Athmakadha, where she acted as a school-going youth who turns blind like her father. Her dialogue "Ayyo acha pokalle" in the film Chinthavishtayaya Shyamala is extremely popular among Malayali audience. Post-marriage she made her debut into Malayalam television with the serial Sundari which rose her into fame and is currently active on Malayalam serial industry.

Personal life
Shafna was born as the second daughter of Nizam and Shahida. She has an elder sister Shabna and younger sister Shaina. Shafna married her longtime boyfriend Sajin TP; her co-actor in the Malayalam film Plus two, on 11 December 2013. Sajin later rose to fame essaying the role of Shivaramakrishnan in the TV series Santhwanam.

Filmography

Television

Serials

TV shows

Awards
2016 – Kerala State Television Award for Best Actress (Sahayathrika)

References

External links

Living people
21st-century Indian actresses
Indian film actresses
Actresses from Thiruvananthapuram
Actresses in Tamil cinema
Actresses in Malayalam cinema
Actresses in Malayalam television
Indian television actresses
Actresses in Telugu cinema
Child actresses in Malayalam cinema
20th-century Indian actresses
Indian child actresses
1990 births
Actresses in Telugu television